Bill Fairband (born June 11, 1941) is a former American football linebacker. He played for the Oakland Raiders from 1967 to 1968.

References

1941 births
Living people
American football linebackers
Colorado Buffaloes football players
Oakland Raiders players